Daniel Kevin Sodickson is an American physicist and an expert in the field of biomedical imaging.  A past president and gold medalist of the International Society for Magnetic Resonance in Medicine, he is credited with foundational work in parallel magnetic resonance imaging (MRI), in which distributed arrays of detectors are used to gather magnetic resonance images at previously inaccessible speeds.   Sodickson is an elected Fellow of the US National Academy of Inventors.  He currently serves as Vice-Chair for Research in the Department of Radiology at New York University (NYU) Grossman School of Medicine, as Director of the department's Bernard and Irene Schwartz Center for Biomedical Imaging, as Principal Investigator of the Center for Advanced Imaging Innovation and Research, and as Co-Director of NYU's Tech4Health Institute.

Education and Career 
Sodickson grew up in Newton, Massachusetts, the son of a physicist and a social worker.  He attended the Roxbury Latin School from 1978-1984, matriculating at Yale College in 1984. Dr. Sodickson graduated from Yale in 1988 with a BS in Physics and a BA in Humanities. He earned his PhD in Medical Physics from MIT in 2004 and his MD from Harvard Medical School in 2006, both as a part of the Harvard-MIT Division of Health Sciences and Technology.

Sodickson then joined the faculty of Harvard Medical School, ultimately serving as Director of Magnetic Resonance Research in the Department of Radiology at Beth Israel Deaconess Medical Center in Boston, Massachusetts, before he joined NYU School of Medicine in 2006 as Director of the Department of Radiology's Center for Biomedical Imaging.  In 2009, he became Vice-Chair for Research in Radiology at NYU. 

A member, Fellow, and former Trustee of the ISMRM, Sodickson served as its President in 2017-2018.  He also chaired the National Institutes of Health Study Section on Biomedical Imaging Technology (BMIT-A) from 2016-2018.

Research and Professional Activities 
Following Sodickson's 1997 paper introducing a rapid imaging technique called SiMultaneous Acquisition of Spatial Harmonics (SMASH), research and development in parallel MRI burgeoned, along with related research in image reconstruction and detector design. Parallel imaging hardware and software is now an integral part of modern MRI machines, and is used routinely in MRI scans worldwide. For his work in parallel MRI, Sodickson was awarded the Gold Medal of the ISMRM in 2006.

Sodickson's research team at NYU has developed rapid, continuous, comprehensive imaging approaches, taking advantage of complementary tools in image acquisition and reconstruction, including parallel imaging and detector arrays, compressed sensing, and artificial intelligence (AI). 

Recently, Sodickson has explored new uses of emerging AI techniques in medical imaging. He helped to initiate the fastMRI collaboration between NYU Grossman School of Medicine and Facebook Artificial Intelligence Research, announced in August of 2018, which aims to accelerate MRI using machine learning methods, and which has also resulted in a large open-source repository of raw MRI data. 

In addition to delivering presentations at scientific meetings, Sodickson has spoken on the history and future of imaging in a variety of more general-interest venues.

Selected Honors and Awards 

 2005: Fellow, International Society for Magnetic Resonance in Medicine
 2006: Gold Medalist, International Society for Magnetic Resonance in Medicine
 2013 Distinguished Investigator, Academy for Radiology and Biomedical Imaging Research
 2014: Author of one of “30 Magnetic Resonance in Medicine Papers that Helped to Shape our Field”
 2017: New Horizons Lecturer, Radiological Society of North America
 2019: Kernspintomographie-Preis (Magnetic Resonance Imaging Award) recipient
2020: Fellow, US National Academy of Inventors

References 

1966 births
Living people
21st-century American physicists
New York University Grossman School of Medicine faculty
Yale College alumni
Massachusetts Institute of Technology alumni
Harvard Medical School alumni